is a Japanese footballer currently playing as a defender for Roasso Kumamoto as a designated special player.

Career statistics

Club
.

Notes

References

1999 births
Living people
People from Ogōri, Fukuoka
Association football people from Fukuoka Prefecture
Fukuoka University alumni
Japanese footballers
Association football defenders
J3 League players
J2 League players
Roasso Kumamoto players